Robert Mardini (born 1972) is Director-General of the International Committee of the Red Cross (ICRC).

Early life and education 
Mardini was born and raised in Tripoli, Lebanon. He was educated at the  Lycée Franco-Libanais Alphonse de Lamartine and at the  Ecole Polytechnique Fédérale de Lausanne (EPFL) in Switzerland, where he was awarded a Master of Science in civil engineering and hydraulics in 1996.

Professional career 
Mardini joined the ICRC in 1997, coordinating water engineering programmes in Rwanda and Iraq, before leading the organization’s Water & Habitat Unit with projects in over 40 countries, improving access to water, sanitation and hygiene services to around 14 million people per year. He went on to hold various senior positions within the organization, including Deputy Director General (2010-2012), Regional Director for the Near and Middle East (2012-2018) and Permanent Observer of the ICRC to the United Nations & Head of Delegation in New York (2018-2020). 
In this latter role, Mardini steered the ICRC’s diplomatic engagement with the UN Security Council, the UN General Assembly, Member States and UN entities to influence decisions on humanitarian issues across policy themes and geographic contexts.  
He has spoken and published on a broad range of key issues such as armed conflict and humanitarian crisis in the Middle East; international humanitarian law;  sexual violence in conflict;  humanitarian action and counter-terrorism measures;  and the future of humanitarian action.
Mardini was appointed ICRC Director-General in October 2019 , and took up his position on 30 March 2020. In October 2020, he received the EPFL Alumni Award for his 'exceptional career'.

Mardini’s tenure began during the COVID-19 pandemic, quickly followed by the Russia-Ukraine international armed conflict, which precipitated a period of extraordinary humanitarian needs worldwide set against shrinking aid budgets. As a result, the ICRC’s planned budget of CHF2.79 billion ($2.99 billion) for 2023 – focusing on many of the world’s most neglected and most underfunded humanitarian crises – faced a potential shortfall of up to CHF 700 million.

Personal life 
Mardini has Lebanese and Swiss citizenship. He is married and has two daughters.

References 

1972 births
Living people
Date of birth missing (living people)
People from Tripoli, Lebanon
Red Cross personnel